Hardy Strickland (November 24, 1818 – January 24, 1884) was a prominent Confederate politician. He was born in Jackson County, Georgia, and served in the state legislature from 1847 to 1858. He served in the Confederate Army and represented the state in the First Confederate Congress.

External links
 http://politicalgraveyard.com/bio/strickland.html

Members of the Confederate House of Representatives from Georgia (U.S. state)
19th-century American politicians
1818 births
1884 deaths